Gioffre is a given name and surname. Notable people with the surname include:

Anthony B. Gioffre (1907–1996), American lawyer and politician
Gioffre Borgia ( 1481– 1516), Italian noble
Gioffré (drag queen), Italian drag queen

See also
Jofre (name)

Italian masculine given names